Zeta Pyxidis (ζ Pyxidis) is a wide binary star system in the southern constellation of Pyxis. It is visible to the naked eye with a combined apparent visual magnitude of +4.88.  Based upon an annual parallax shift of 13.35 mas as seen from Earth, it is located around 244 light years from the Sun.

At the age of 1.88 billion years, is a red clump star that is generating energy through the fusion of helium at its core. The primary has nearly double the mass of the Sun and is radiating 69 times the Sun's luminosity from its photosphere at an effective temperature of 4,876 K.

The companion, component B, is a magnitude 9.59 star at an angular separation of 52.20 arc seconds along a position angle of 61°, as of 2010.

References

G-type giants
Horizontal-branch stars
Binary stars
Pyxidis, Zeta
Pyxis (constellation)
Durchmusterung objects
073898
042483
3433